The Global Security Challenge runs international business plan competitions to find and select the most promising security technology startups in the world. The GSC holds regional selection events and a Security Summit in London to bring together innovators with government, industry and investors. The GSC belongs to InnoCentive, which acquired the original owner OmniCompete in 2012. OmniCompete also launched the Energy Storage Challenge in 2010.

History
The GSC was founded by MBA students of London Business School in spring 2006; the first  competition took place in summer 2006. By 2007, the Technical Support Working Group, an interagency group of the US Government, sponsored the annual grant award of $500,000 Dollar for the winning security startup. The GSC runs regional finals in Singapore at the National University of Singapore, in Washington DC at The University of Maryland and Brussels at the Brussels School of International Studies ahead of the GSC London Security Summit in autumn, hosted by London Business School.

Past competitions' winners and finalists
GSC finalists and winners from the last three annual competitions have subsequently raised over $117 million in new venture funding and grants. The top-selected startups also have secured large contracts with government clients, such as the US Department of Energy, the US Navy and the US Department of Defense, and with industry behemoths, such as Siemens and Bayer AG from Germany. One regional finalist in 2007, TenCube, recently got acquired by McAfee and the cyber 2009 winner Ksplice was acquired in July 2011 by Oracle.

Most Promising Security Start-Up of the Year
Start-Up Winner from 2006: Ingenia Technology (UK)
Start-Up Winner from 2007: NoblePeak Vision (USA)
Start-Up Winner from 2008: TRX Systems (USA)
Start-Up Winner from 2009: Adaptive Imaging Technologies (Israel)
Start-Up Winner from 2010: mPedigree (Ghana)
Start-Up Winner from 2011: Arktis Radiation Detectors Ltd (Switzerland)
Start-Up Winner from 2012: SQR Systems Ltd (UK)

Most Promising Security Idea of the Year
 Best Security Idea 2008: Homergent Inc (USA)
 Best Security Idea 2009: Remedium Technologies (USA)

Crowded Places Challenge winners
 Best Crowded Places Security Idea 2008: Crowd-Vision (Switzerland) 
 Best Crowded Places Security Idea 2009: iOmniscient (Australia)

Other competition categories
 Winner of Cyber Security Challenge 2009: Ksplice (USA)
 Winner of Cyber Security Challenge 2010: Masking Networks (USA)
 Winner of Cloud Security Challenge 2010: CloudSwitch (USA)
 Security SME of the Year 2009:  Kromek (UK)
 Security SME of the Year 2010: iwebgate (Australia/UK)
 Security SME of the Year 2011: Agnitio (Spain)

Judges
The members of the GSC Judging Committees are leaders from venture capital funds, government, universities and industry.

Government
 Defence Science & Technology Agency (Singapore Government)
 Home Office (UK Government)
 UK Ministry of Defence (Counter Terrorism Science & Technology Centre)
 National Science Foundation
 Technical Support Working Group (TSWG) - US Department of Defense
 Office of Naval Research - ONR Global

Venture capital
 Kleiner Perkins Caufield & Byers
 Advent Venture Partners
 3V SourceOne Capital
 Cap Vista
 NovakBiddle Venture Partners
 Paladin Capital Group
 PegasusBridge Fund Management Limited
 Redshift Ventures
 SAIC Venture Capital Corp.
 Siemens Venture Capital

University
 London Business School
 Mississippi State University
 National University of Singapore
 UnternehmerTum (Technical University of Munich)
 University of Kent
 University of Maryland, College Park

Industry
 Accenture
 BAE Systems
 Booz Allen Hamilton
 Barclays Bank
 Bosch
 BWI-IT (IBM, Siemens & German Armed Forces)
 IBM
 MITRE
 SemCorp Industries
 Smiths Detection

Events
The GSC hosts several regional Semi-Finals and one Grand Final (Summit) at leading research universities around the world: 
 University of Maryland, College Park
 Northwestern University
 National University of Singapore
 University of Kent
 London Business School is the host of the annual GSC Security Summit. The 5th annual GSC Security Summit  occurred on November 11+12 2010 in London.

See also 
 List of general science and technology awards 
 Best of Biotech
 DARPA Grand Challenge

Sources 
United States Department of State
http://www.iht.com/articles/2007/11/26/business/invent.php
http://www.msstate.edu/web/media/detail.php?id=3904

External links
 Global Security Challenge official website

Security
Business plan competitions
Recurring events established in 2006
Science competitions